Jordan Woods-Robinson is an American actor, musician and composer, He is best known for his portrayal of Eric Raleigh in The Walking Dead series. He has also appeared in Magic City and Drop Dead Diva.

Early life and education 
Woods-Robinson was born and raised in the city of Bybee, Tennessee on an animal rescue farm. He moved to New York City and graduated from the NYU's Tisch School of Arts.

Career
A few weeks after graduation, Woods-Robinson was cast as a Blue Man with the Blue Man Group, where he traveled around the world while performing at the shows. Woods-Robinson is a composer and a co-founder of an online recording company of musicians and vocalists called SOSstudio. Woods-Robinson is a multi-instrumentalist with several instruments such as violin, mandolin, guitar, and bass.

Filmography

Film

Television

Discography
2015 - Red Haired Boy
2016 - Anthem

References

External links 

Living people
1985 births
Male actors from Tennessee
American male film actors
American male television actors
Tisch School of the Arts alumni
People from Cocke County, Tennessee